The Sherbrooke Indians were a minor league baseball team located in Sherbrooke, Quebec, Canada. They played in the Provincial League from 1948 to 1951 as the Sherbrooke Athletics and again from 1953 to 1955 as the Indians. They won the first Provincial League pennant in 1948. In 1951, they won a second pennant, but five hours after their final game, their stadium burned down, forcing the team to sit out the 1952 season as the ballpark was rebuilt. When they returned to action in 1953, they were affiliated with the Cleveland Indians.

Season-by-season

Major League alumni

Gary Bell
Bill Brandt
Dick Brown
Paul Calvert
John Corriden
Bill Dailey
Harry Feldman
Roland Gladu
Frank Jelincich
Lou Knerr
Bobby Locke
Fred Martin
Ralph McCabe
William Metzig
Dan Osinski
Armando Roche
Jean-Pierre Roy
Hal Schacker
Ralph Schwamb
Ebba St. Claire
Billy Williams
Adrian Zabala

References

Defunct minor league baseball teams
Defunct baseball teams in Canada
Baseball teams in Quebec
Baseball teams established in 1948
1948 establishments in Quebec
1955 disestablishments in Quebec
Sports clubs disestablished in 1955
Baseball teams disestablished in 1955